Nikolaos Anastasopoulos (born 1 February 1993) is a Greek professional footballer who plays as a defensive midfielder for Super League 2 club Apollon Smyrnis.

Career
Anastasopoulos began his career in the youth teams of Asteras Tripolis before making his senior debut while on loan at Niki Volos. The next season, he moved to Panachaiki, where he scored one goal in 24 appearances in the Football League Greece. On 23 July 2015, Anastasopoulos moved to AEL and signed a three-year contract. He made his Super League Greece debut on 12 September 2016 against Iraklis.

References

External links

 
 

1993 births
Living people
Greek footballers
Sportspeople from Sparta, Peloponnese
Association football midfielders
Asteras Tripolis F.C. players
Niki Volos F.C. players
Panachaiki F.C. players
Athlitiki Enosi Larissa F.C. players
PAS Lamia 1964 players
PAE Kerkyra players
Panserraikos F.C. players
Super League Greece players
Football League (Greece) players
Gamma Ethniki players
Footballers from the Peloponnese